Events in the year 1398 in Japan.

Incumbents
Monarch: Go-Komatsu

Deaths
January 31 - Emperor Sukō (b. 1334)

References

 
 
Japan
Years of the 14th century in Japan